Putifigari (Potuvigari in Sardinian) is a comune (municipality) in the Province of Sassari in the Italian region Sardinia, located about  northwest of Cagliari and about  southwest of Sassari.

Putifigari borders the following municipalities: Alghero, Ittiri, Uri, Villanova Monteleone.

References

Cities and towns in Sardinia